Waiting for the Moon is a 1987 internationally co-produced drama film starring Linda Hunt,  Linda Bassett, Bernadette Lafont, Bruce McGill, Jacques Boudet and Andrew McCarthy. The film was written by Mark Magill and directed by Jill Godmilow.

Plot
Set in the 1930s, the film depicts Gertrude Stein and her lover and assistant Alice B. Toklas meeting Pablo Picasso and his lover Fernande Olivier, as well as the authors Ernest Hemingway and Guillaume Apollinaire.

Cast
 Linda Hunt as Alice B. Toklas
 Linda Bassett as Gertrude Stein
 Bernadette Lafont as Fernande Olivier
 Bruce McGill as Ernest Hemingway
 Jacques Boudet as Guillaume Apollinaire
 Andrew McCarthy as Henry Hopper

Reception
On Rotten Tomatoes it has a rating of 43% based on reviews from 7 critics.

References

External links
 
 Waiting for the Moon, Facets Multimedia, YouTube
 

1987 films
1987 drama films
1987 independent films
1987 LGBT-related films
American independent films
British independent films
French independent films
German independent films
Cultural depictions of Gertrude Stein
Cultural depictions of Ernest Hemingway
English-language French films
English-language German films
Films about writers
Lesbian-related films
LGBT-related drama films
Films set in the 1930s
American Playhouse
Sundance Film Festival award winners
1980s English-language films
1980s American films
1980s British films
1980s French films